Ferdinand Anton Franz Karsch or Karsch-Haack (2 September 1853, in Münster – 20 December 1936, in Berlin) was a German arachnologist, entomologist and anthropologist.

The son of a doctor, Karsch was educated at the Friedrich Wilhelm University in Berlin and published a thesis on the gall wasp in 1877.  From 1878 to 1921 he held the post of curator at the Museum für Naturkunde Berlin.  Between 1873 and 1893, he published a catalogue of the spiders of Westphalia; he also published numerous articles on the specimens that the museum received from various explorers and naturalists working in Africa, in China, in Japan, in Australia, etc.  This publication of others' work sometimes led to disputes over priority and nomenclature, for example with Pickard-Cambridge.

Alongside his zoological activities, he published many works on sexuality and, in particular, homosexuality in both the animal kingdom and in so-called "primitive" peoples, including Das gleichgeschlechtliche Leben der Kulturvölker - Ostasiaten: Chinesen, Japanese, Korea in 1906 on homosexuality in East Asian societies and in 1911 Das gleichgeschlechtliche Leben der Naturvölker on homosexuality in Africa and indigenous societies of Asia, Australia and the Americas. Karsch lived in later life as an open homosexual in Berlin. The rise of Hitler to power and Nazi repression of homosexuality led to the eclipse of his reputation.

Some of the animals described

Spiders
 Misgolas 1878 – New South Wales, Australia
 Portia schultzi 1878 — Central, East, Southern Africa, Madagascar
 Holothele 1879 - Venezuela
 Linothele 1879 — South America
 Sphaerobothria 1879 – Costa Rica
 Thelechoris 1881 — Africa, Madagascar
 Tribe Diplocentrini 1880
 Acontius 1879 — Africa
 Heterothele 1879 – Africa Congo
 Pedinopistha 1880 – Hawaii
 Campostichomma  1891 — Sri Lanka (one species)
 Corinnomma  1880
 Megalostrata  1880
 Chilobrachys 1891
 Myrmarachne

Other animals
Potamarcha (1890)

Publications on African butterflies
Karsch, F. (1892a) Vorläufige Beschreibung von drei neuen Lepidopteren von Bismarckburg im Togolande (Deutschwestafrika). Entomologische Nachrichten. Berlin 18:113-117.   
Karsch, F. (1892b) Insekten von Baliburg (Deutsch-Westafrika) gesammelt von Herrn Dr. Eugen Zintgraff. Entomologische Nachrichten. Berlin 18:161-183.   
Karsch, F. (1892c) Abantis bismarcki, eine neue Hesperiide von Bismarcksburg im Togolande (Deutschwestafrika). Entomologische Nachrichten. Berlin 18:228-229.   
Karsch, F. (1892d) Caprona adelica, eine neue Hesperiide von der deutschen Forschungsstation Bismarckburg im Togolande (Westafrika). Entomologische Nachrichten. Berlin 18:241-244.   
Karsch, F. (1893a) Die Insekten der Berglandschaft Adeli im Hinterlande von Togo (Westafrika). Berliner Entomologische Zeitschrift 38:1-266.   
Karsch, F. (1893b) Papilioniden aus Kamerun, gesammelt von Herrn Dr. Paul Preuss. Berliner Entomologische Zeitschrift 38:367-372.   
Karsch, F. (1894a) Eine neue ostafrikanische Lepidopteren-Gattung und -Art aus der Familie der Satyriden. Entomologische Nachrichten. Berlin 20:190-192.   
Karsch, F. (1894b) Einige neue afrikanische Tagfalter aus den Familien der Nymphaliden, Acraeiden, Danaididen und Satyriden. Entomologische Nachrichten. Berlin 20:209-240.   
Karsch, F. (1894c) Über die seltene Nymphalide Harma concordia Hopff. Entomologische Nachrichten. Berlin 20:257-259.   
Karsch, F. (1894d) Pseudathyma neptidina, eine neue Nymphalide aus dem Hinterlande von Kamerun. Entomologische Nachrichten. Berlin 20:289-290.   
Karsch, F. (1894e) Über einige unbekannte oder ungenügend bekannte, durch Herrn G. Zenker auf der deutschen Forschungsstation Yaunde im Hinterlande von Kamerun gesammelte Nymphaliden. Berliner Entomologische Zeitschrift 39:1-16.   
Karsch, F. (1895a) Papilio neumanni, eine neue, von Herrn Oskar Neumann in Ost-Afrika erbeutete Art der Echerioides-Gruppe. Entomologische Nachrichten. Berlin 21:225-227.   
Karsch, F. (1895b) Äthiopische Rhopaloceren. I. Entomologische Nachrichten. Berlin 21:275-286.   
Karsch, F. (1895c) Äthiopische Rhopaloceren. II. Entomologische Nachrichten. Berlin 21:289-322.   
Karsch, F. (1896) Äthiopische Hesperiiden. Entomologische Nachrichten. Berlin 22:372-378.   
Karsch, F. (1897) Neue Eingänge deutsch-ostafrikanischer Insekten im Museum fur Naturkunde zu Berlin. Entomologische Nachrichten. Berlin 23:366-372.   
Karsch, F. (1898a) Über die aus der Irangi-Expedition gesammelten Orthoptera und Lepidoptera. In: Werther, C.W. (1898) Die mittleren Hochländer des nördlichen Deutsch-Ost-Afrika, Berlin 311-317.   
Karsch, F. (1898b) Neue Eingänge deutsch-ostafrikanischer Insekten im Museum fur Naturkunde zu Berlin II. Entomologische Nachrichten. Berlin 24:97-105.   
Karsch, F. (1900a) Ein neuer Papilio (P. thuraui) aus Ostafrika. Entomologische Nachrichten. Berlin 26:126-128.   
Karsch, F. (1900b) Drei neue Lepidopteren aus Ostafrika gesammelt von Herrn Stabsarzt Dr. Fulleborn. Entomologische Nachrichten. Berlin 26:353-359.   
Karsch, F. (1900c) Vorläufige kurze Kennzeichnung von fünf neuen, durch Herrn Dr. A. Voeltzkow in West-Madagaskar entdeckten Lepidopteren. Entomologische Nachrichten. Berlin 26:367-370
Wikispecies (see below) provides a list of and links to digitised papers by Karsch

About homosexuality
 Das gleichgeschlechtliche Leben der Naturvölker, 1911, online at archive.org
 Karsch, F. (2022). Karl Heinrich Ulrichs' predecessor Heinrich Hössli (1784-1864): The first known literary activist and parent of a gay man. (M. Lombardi-Nash, Trans.). Jacksonville, FL: Urania Manuscripts. (Original work published 1903)
 Karsch, F. (2021). Male and female homosexuality in animals on the basis of literature. (M. Lombardi-Nash, Trans.). Jacksonville, FL: Urania Manuscripts. (Original work published 1900)

Literature
 Robert Aldrich, Garry Wotherspoon, Who's Who in Gay and Lesbian History: From Antiquity to World War II (2nd ed), Routledge, 2002, pp. 281–282.
 Bernd-Ulrich Hergemöller, Man for Man, Suhrkamp, 2001, pp. 410–411.

References

1853 births
1936 deaths
German anthropologists
German sexologists
German taxonomists
German arachnologists
German lepidopterists
Hymenopterists
German gay writers
Gay scientists
German LGBT scientists
20th-century German LGBT people
19th-century German LGBT people
German male non-fiction writers
19th-century German male writers
20th-century German male writers
19th-century German zoologists
20th-century German zoologists
People from Münster
Scientists active at the Museum für Naturkunde, Berlin
Humboldt University of Berlin alumni